Juhan Telgmaa (born 3 January 1946 Juuru) is an Estonian politician. He was a member of VIII Riigikogu.

References

Living people
1946 births
Members of the Riigikogu, 1995–1999
People's Union of Estonia politicians
Estonian Coalition Party politicians
Estonian University of Life Sciences alumni
Academic staff of the Estonian University of Life Sciences
People from Rapla Parish